Rinn is the surname of:

 Charles Rinn (1849–1929), French hellenist and lexicographer
 Danuta Rinn, stage name of Polish singer and actress Danuta Rynduch-Czyżewska (1936–2006)
 Hans Rinn (born 1953), East German former luger
 Joseph F. Rinn (1868–1952), American magician and skeptic of paranormal phenomena
 Liam Ó Rinn (1886–1943), Irish civil servant and Irish-language writer and translator born William J. Ring
 Paul X. Rinn (1946–2022), United States Navy captain